"FIFA's Dirty Secrets" is an episode of the BBC documentary series Panorama which was broadcast on 29 November 2010.

Overview
The half-hour programme saw investigative journalist Andrew Jennings look into allegations of corruption with FIFA, the world's governing body of association football. Within the programme, he alleged that three members of FIFA's executive committee had been given bribes by International Sports and Leisure, a marketing partner of FIFA. The three men Nicolas Leoz, Issa Hayatou, and Ricardo Teixeira were reportedly involved with a sports marketing firm responsible for broadcasting rights and took money from them. Jennings further alleged that a fourth current official has been involved in ticket touting. Both of these matters had not been properly investigated by Sepp Blatter, the President of FIFA. It also made a series of claims about the bidding process for hosting the FIFA World Cup.

Hayatou, who is the vice-president of FIFA, denied all accusations of involvement in the scheme and claimed money was in fact paid to the Confederation of African Football (CAF). He threatened to sue the BBC for the making of the documentary.

The documentary was broadcast only three days before the result of the bidding process for the 2018 and 2022 FIFA World Cups were announced. This led to fears from some people that it could ruin England's chances of hosting the former tournament, with some accusing the BBC of being unpatriotic; however, the BBC defended these claims. Russia ultimately won the right to host the FIFA World Cup in 2018, with Qatar emerging victorious for the 2022 tournament. The question of whether the documentary was a crucial factor in England losing the contest was brought up after the result was announced.

The programme received 51 complaints from viewers.

See also
 2015 FIFA corruption case

References

External links
BBC's Panorama, FIFA's Dirty secrets, transcript

BBC television documentaries
Association football controversies
Documentary films about association football
FIFA
Panorama (British TV programme)
2010 British television episodes
British sports documentary films
FIFA World Cup